East Greenville is an unincorporated community in Stark County, in the U.S. state of Ohio.

History
East Greenville had its start when a post office called Greenville was established there in the 1820s. The name was changed to East Greenville in 1832, and the post office closed in 1914.

References

Unincorporated communities in Stark County, Ohio
Unincorporated communities in Ohio